A crop is a plant that can be grown and harvested extensively for profit or subsistence. When the plants of the same kind are cultivated at one place on a large scale, it is called a crop. Most crops are cultivated in agriculture or hydroponics. Crops may include macroscopic fungus (e.g. mushrooms) and marine macroalga (e.g. seaweed), some of which are grown in aquaculture.

Most crops are harvested as food for humans or fodder for livestock. Some crops are gathered from the wild often in a form of intensive gathering (e.g. ginseng, yohimbe, and eucommia).

Important non-food crops include horticulture, floriculture and industrial crops. Horticulture crops include plants used for other crops (e.g. fruit trees). Floriculture crops include bedding plants, houseplants, flowering garden and pot plants, cut cultivated greens, and cut flowers. Industrial crops are produced for clothing (fiber crops e.g. cotton), biofuel (energy crops, algae fuel), or medicine (medicinal plants).

Important food crops

The importance of a crop varies greatly by region. Globally, the following crops contribute most to human food supply (values of kcal/person/day for 2013 given in parentheses): rice (541 kcal), wheat (527 kcal), sugarcane and other sugar crops (200 kcal), maize (corn) (147 kcal), soybean oil (82 kcal), other vegetables (74 kcal), potatoes (64 kcal), palm oil (52 kcal), cassava (37 kcal), legume pulses (37 kcal), sunflower seed oil (35 kcal), rape and mustard oil (34 kcal), other fruits, (31 kcal), sorghum (28 kcal), millet (27 kcal), groundnuts (25 kcal), beans (23 kcal), sweet potatoes (22 kcal), bananas (21 kcal), various nuts (16 kcal), soybeans (14 kcal), cottonseed oil (13 kcal), groundnut oil (13 kcal), yams (13 kcal). Note that many of the globally apparently minor crops are regionally very important. For example, in Africa, roots & tubers dominate with 421 kcal/person/day, and sorghum and millet contribute 135 kcal and 90 kcal, respectively.

In terms of produced weight, the following crops are the most important ones (global production in thousand metric tonnes):

Methods of cropping and popular crops in the U.S. 
There are various methods of cropping that are used in the agricultural industry, such as mono cropping, crop rotation, sequential cropping, and mixed intercropping. Each method of cropping have their purposes and possibly disadvantages to them as well. Himanshu Arora defines mono cropping as where a field only grows one specific crop year round. Mono Cropping has its disadvantages, according to Himanshu Arora, such as the risk of the soil losing its fertility. Following mono cropping, another method of cropping is relay cropping. According to the National Library of Medicine, relay cropping may solve a number of conflicts such as inefficient use of available resources, controversies in sowing time, fertilizer application, and soil degradation. The result coming from the use of relay cropping is higher crop output. In the United States, corn is the largest crop produced, and soybean follows in at second, according to the government of Alberta. Referring to a map given by the Government of Alberta, the most popular region to grow these popular crops are in the inner states of the U.S., it is where the crops are most successful in output.

See also
 Agriculture classification of crops

 General topics and economics
 Cash crop
 Food crop
 Crop cultivation
 Crop yield
 Fruit trees
 Industrial crop
 Intensive crop farming
 Intercropping
 List of most valuable crops and livestock products
 Multiple cropping
 Neglected and underutilized crop
 Permanent crop
 Sharecropping
 Staple food
 Nursery plants
 Floriculture crops
 Guerrilla gardening
 Management practices
 Cover crop
 Crop destruction
 Crop residue
 Crop rotation
 Crop weed
 Kharif crops (crops specific to South Asia)
 Nurse crop
 Rabi crops (crops specific to South Asia)
 Genetic diversity
 Crop diversity
 Crop wild relative
 Seed bank
 Origin
 Neolithic founder crops

References

Further reading